The gear housing is a mechanical housing that surrounds the mechanical components of a gear box.
It provides mechanical support for the moving components, a mechanical protection from the outside world for those internal components, and a fluid-tight container to hold the lubricant that bathes those components.

Types of housings

A split housing is like a walnut shell, the housing is divided in two parts, and lower part that tie down the Gear Box to the structure, support all the components during the assembly stage and hold the lubrication oil; and the upper part that complete the enclosure and provide mechanical integrity to the Housing. The upper and lower parts of the housing have a mating surface that seals perfectly the housing to avoid oil leaks and fatigue of the housing.

A bathtub housing is made on a single piece and have a top opening for servicing the gear box and side opening to accommodate the bearing housing associated to the gear shafts. Have in general a better leak free performance but is more difficult to assemble and repair.

Methods of manufacture
Traditionally, it is made from cast iron or cast aluminium, using methods of permanent mold casting or shell molding. Experimentally, though, composite materials have also been used.

See also
Overdrive (mechanics)
Spiral bevel gear
Ford Type 9 transmission
Tremec TR-3650 transmission

References

Bibliography

Automotive transmission technologies